Carmen bin Laden (née Dufour; born 1954) is a Swiss author. She was a member of the bin Laden family, having entered the family by marriage to Yeslam bin Ladin, a son of the patriarch Muhammad bin Ladin; they have since divorced.

Biography

Early life
Carmen Dufour was born in 1954 in Lausanne, Switzerland. Her father was Swiss (Dufour) and her mother was Persian (Mirdokht-Sheybani). She was raised in Lausanne by her mother along with three other sisters (Salomé, Béatrice, and Magnolia).

Adult life
From 1974 to 1988, she was married to Yeslam bin Ladin, an older half-brother of Osama bin Laden. They were married in 1974 in Jeddah, Saudi Arabia. They had three daughters, Wafah Dufour, Najia and Noor.

In 2004, she published Inside the Kingdom: My Life in Saudi Arabia, a personal account of her life as a Saudi Arabian wife and mother. The book contains insights into life in the bin Laden family and her relationship with them and her former husband. She claims that no matter how westernized her ex-husband or other bin Laden family members may be, they still feel strong familial and religious ties, and would have financially supported and sheltered Osama bin Laden if necessary, prior to his May 2011 death. She admits that while she found it difficult to adjust to the restrictive Saudi Arabian society, her lifestyle was one of privilege.

She later moved to Geneva with her then husband and three children, and finally left her husband in 1988, asking for a divorce in 1994. She alleges that her ex-husband engaged in emotional blackmail including threatening to kidnap her children, adultery, and forced her to undergo an abortion. She finally obtained a divorce 12 years later in January 2006. Yeslam bin Ladin is reportedly uninvolved and uninterested in the lives of his former wife and daughters. He is quoted in Carmen Dufour's book as saying that he wished he had sons and not daughters. Yeslam has obtained a Swiss passport supposedly for the purpose of pursuing a relationship with his children.

In her book, she writes that she had only seen Osama bin Laden on two occasions and that they did not really speak. She emphasizes that the bin Laden family is a large one, and not all family members are directly associated with Osama bin Laden.

See also
 Bin Laden family

References
 Bin Laden, Carmen. Inside the Kingdom: My Life in Saudi Arabia. Warner Books: New York, 2004.

External links
Powell's book page

1954 births
Living people
Former Muslim critics of Islam
People from Lausanne
Carmen
Swiss writers
Swiss people of Iranian descent